The Blue Peter Summer Expedition was a yearly tradition in which the presenters of the BBC children's TV programme Blue Peter go to a foreign country and experience the culture and film special reports from that country, which are broadcast over several weeks in September and October. The first expedition was in 1965 and they have gone somewhere every year after that, apart from 1986 and 2011.

The Summer Expedition was traditionally announced on the last programme of the series which is usually towards the end of June. From 1971, the highlights of the expedition were shown as special programmes the following summer under the title Blue Peter Flies The World.

In 2012, with the series being broadcast all year round, the summer expedition was changed. It has been renamed the "Blue Peter Road Trip" and had purpose for going to a country(s). For the 2012 road trip, the presenters visited Poland and Ukraine because of the Euro 2012 games. The road trip was filmed over the course of one or two weeks. These would then be made as films for the live show and special programmes as usual. The expedition was abandoned after 2012.

To date, the Blue Peter team has visited the following countries:

1965 – Norway
1966 – Singapore and Borneo (without John Noakes)
1967 – Jamaica and New York City
1968 – Morocco
1969 – Ceylon
1970 – Mexico
1971 – Iceland, Norway and Denmark
1972 – Fiji, Tonga and San Francisco
1973 – Ivory Coast
1974 – Thailand
1975 – Turkey
1976 – Brunei
1977 – Brazil
1978 – United States
1979 – Egypt
1980 – Malaysia
1981 – Japan
1982 – Canada
1983 – Sri Lanka
1984 – Kenya
1985 – Australia 
1986 – no trip, due to budget cuts
1987 – Soviet Union
1988 – West Coast of the United States (without Mark Curry)
1989 – Zimbabwe
1990 – The Caribbean
1991 – Japan (without Yvette Fielding)
1992 – Hungary with Anthea Turner, and New Zealand with Yvette Fielding
1993 – Argentina (without John Leslie)
1994 – New England, United States
1995 – South Africa
1996 – Hong Kong and China
1997 – Canada
1998 – Mexico
1999 – Australia
2000 – Spain
2001 – Vietnam
2002 – Morocco
2003 – Brazil
2004 – India
2005 – Japan (without Liz Barker)
2006 – Southern United States
2007 – Bolivia
2008 – Alaska (with new presenters)
2009 – Turkey
2010 – Italy
2011 – no Summer Expedition, due to move to Salford
2012 – Poland and Ukraine

Summer Expedition